Hans Prinzhorn (6 June 1886 – 14 June 1933) was a German psychiatrist and art historian.

Born in Hemer, Westphalia, he studied art history and philosophy at the University of Vienna, receiving his doctorate in 1908. He then went to England to receive voice training, as he planned to become a professional singer. He later received training in medicine and psychiatry, serving as an Army surgeon during World War I.

In 1919 he became assistant to Karl Wilmanns at the psychiatric hospital of the University of Heidelberg. His task was to expand an earlier collection of art created by the mentally ill and started by Emil Kraepelin. When he left in 1921 the collection was extended to more than 5,000 works by about 450 "cases".

In 1922 he published his first and most influential book, Bildnerei der Geisteskranken. Ein Beitrag zur Psychologie und Psychopatologie der Gestaltung (The plastic activity of the mentally ill. A contribution to the psychology and psychopathology of formal configuration), richly illustrated with examples from the collection. While his colleagues were reserved in their reaction, the art scene was enthusiastic. Jean Dubuffet was highly inspired by the works, and the term Art Brut was coined.

The book is mainly concerned with the borderline between psychiatry and art, illness and self-expression. It represents one of the first attempts to analyse the work of the mentally ill.

After short stays at sanatoriums in Zurich, Dresden and Wiesbaden, he began a psychotherapy practice in Frankfurt in 1925, but without much success. He continued to write books, and a half dozen were published in his lifetime. His hopes to find a permanent position at a university were never fulfilled. Disillusioned by professional failures, and after three failed marriages, he moved in with an aunt in Munich and retreated from public life, making a living from giving lectures and writing essays. He died in 1933 in Munich of typhus.

Shortly after his death the Prinzhorn Collection was stowed away in the attics of the university. In 1938 a few items were displayed in the Nazi propaganda exhibition Entartete Kunst ("Degenerate Art"). Since 2001 the collection has been on display in a former oratory of the University of Heidelberg.

Books
 Hans Prinzhorn, Artistry of the mentally ill: a contribution to the psychology and psychopathology of configuration, translated by Eric von Brockdorff from the second German edition, with an introduction by James L. Foy (Wien, New York: Springer-Verlag), 1995. 
 Hans Prinzhorn, Expressions de la Folie. Paris: Gallimard, 1984.
Catherine de Zegher (ed.), The Prinzhorn Collection: Traces upon the Wunderblock. Essays by C. de Zegher, Hal Foster, Sander L. Gilman, S. Weiss and Bracha Lichtenberg Ettinger. The Drawing Center's Drawing Papers no. 7, 2000.
 Hans Prinzhorn, "Psychotherapy: Its Natures - Its Assumptions - Its Limitation: A Search for Essentials", translated & Edited in collaboration with the author by Arnold Eiloart (Jonathan Cape), 1932.

Films 
 Christian Beetz, Between Insanity and Beauty - The Art Collection of Dr. Prinzhorn, Adolf-Grimme-Award 2008 (Beetz Brothers Film Production, Germany), 2008.
The film follows the history of the Prinzhorn Collection, illustrating the inner conflicts of the schizophrenic patients through their artwork.

External links 
 The Modern Art Index Project, Metropolitan Museum of Art
 The Prinzhorn collection (in German)
 Robin Pape, Burkhart Brückner: Biography of Hans Prinzhorn in: Biographical Archive of Psychiatry (BIAPSY), 2015.

1886 births
1933 deaths
People from Hemer
German art historians
German psychiatrists
People from the Province of Westphalia
German male non-fiction writers
University of Vienna alumni
Deaths from typhus
German expatriates in the United Kingdom
Expatriates from Germany in the Austro-Hungarian Empire